The Chrysler CM Valiant is an automobile that was produced in Australia by Chrysler Australia from 1978 to 1980 and subsequently by Mitsubishi Australia from 1980 to 1981. It was a facelifted and revised version of the Chrysler CL Valiant, which it replaced. It was the last Australian Chrysler Valiant.

Model range
The CM Valiant was offered in 4 door sedan and 5 door station wagon body styles in the following models:
 Chrysler Valiant sedan
 Chrysler Valiant wagon
 Chrysler Regal sedan
 Chrysler Regal wagon
 Chrysler Regal SE sedan

Regal models were marketed as Chrysler Regals, without the Valiant name.

A GLX pack, option code A16, was offered on the CM Valiant sedan. It featured the 265 cubic inch (4.3 litre) engine, the four speed manual transmission, or 3 speed auto or the 318 v8 engine with an auto, “Hot Wire” cast alloy wheels, a tachometer, front grille paint treatment, tinted side glass, roof console with map light, rear seat armrest, floor console, body stripes and other embellishments.

Changes
The CM models featured a new grille, revised tail lights plus new mouldings and badges. All body panels were carried over from the previous model. The six cylinder engines were now fitted with Chrysler’s “Electronic Lean Burn System” which resulted in easier starting, better responsiveness, smoother running and improved fuel economy.

Utility, Panel Van and Charger coupe models were not carried over from the CL Valiant range.

Engines and transmissions
Three engines were offered:
  I6
  I6
  V8

The  V8 engine option was discontinued around August–September 1980.

Five transmissions were offered:
3 speed manual
4 speed manual
3 speed Torquflite automatic
3 speed TorqueFlite A904 automatic
3 speed Borg-Warner automatic

Production and replacement
The CM Valiant was produced by Chrysler Australia from 1978 until the takeover of that company by Mitsubishi in 1980. Mitsubishi Australia continued production through to 28 August 1981.

A total of 16,500 examples of the Chrysler CM were built with no replacement model introduced.

See also
 Chrysler Valiant

References

Cars of Australia
Valiant vehicles
Valiant (CM)
Cars introduced in 1978
1970s cars
1980s cars